Henri Le Tonnelier de Breteuil (1848-1916) was a French aristocrat and politician.

Early life
Henri Le Tonnelier de Breteuil was born in 1848. He was the son of Alexandre Le Tonnelier, Marquis de Breteuil (son of Achille Le Tonnelier de Breteuil), and his wife Charlotte-Amélie Fould, daughter of the financier Achille Fould.

Career
Breteuil served as a member of the Chamber of Deputies, representing Hautes-Pyrénées. He was a key negotiator in the Triple Entente.

Personal life
Breteuil resided at the Château de Breteuil. He often invited his friend Marcel Proust, who based the character of Hannibal de Bréauté in In Search of Lost Time on him. Breteuil commissioned architect Ernest Sanson to design his Hôtel de Breteuil in the 16th arrondissement of Paris, completed in 1892.

On 3 March 1891, he married the American heiress Marcelite "Lita" Garner, whose sister Florence Garner married the Scottish socialite Sir William Gordon-Cumming.

Death
Breteuil died in Paris in 1916.

References

1848 births
1916 deaths
Politicians from Paris
Orléanists
Members of the 2nd Chamber of Deputies of the French Third Republic
Members of the 4th Chamber of Deputies of the French Third Republic
Members of the 5th Chamber of Deputies of the French Third Republic